Cape Croker Hunting Ground 60B is a reserve located on the Bruce Peninsula bordering the Bruce Peninsula National Park. It is one of the reserves of the Chippewas of Nawash Unceded First Nation.

References

External links
 Canada Land Survey System

Ojibwe reserves in Ontario
Communities in Bruce County
Unceded territories in Ontario
Chippewas of Nawash Unceded First Nation